Andy Kennedy (born March 13, 1968) is an American college basketball coach who currently serves as the head coach of the UAB Blazers men's basketball team. He served as head men's basketball coach at the University of Mississippi (Ole Miss) from 2006 to 2018. Kennedy was a player in high school at both Winston Academy and Louisville High School.  He was a 1986 Parade All-American and he went on to play for North Carolina State and the University of Alabama at Birmingham (UAB).  On March 20, 2020, he was announced as the seventh head coach of UAB.

Playing career

College
Kennedy, a 6'7" forward, was a 1986 Parade All-American, as well as the Mississippi Player of the Year at Louisville High School. He started his collegiate career at North Carolina State where he was a member of Jim Valvano's 1987 Atlantic Coast Conference championship team.

Following his freshman season, Kennedy transferred to UAB where he played under another legendary coach, Gene Bartow. From 1988 to 1991, Kennedy was a two-time all-conference performer that led the Sun Belt Conference in scoring at 21.8 points per game in 1991. Kennedy finished his UAB career as the program's second all-time leading scorer with 1,787 points. Kennedy still holds numerous school and conference records.

On 2022 October 7 Kennedy was inducted into the UAB Sports Hall of Fame. He became just the 4th men's player selected.

Professional
After graduation, Kennedy played briefly for the NBA's Charlotte Hornets at guard. He later began a three-year professional career abroad, playing in Greece, the Netherlands, Spain and Puerto Rico. Chronic knee problems brought his career to an early end. He had his second ACL tear and subsequently his fifth and final knee operation while playing in Puerto Rico and chose to retire as a player and transition into coaching.

Professional career

Early years
Kennedy's coaching career began as an assistant for the University of South Alabama during the 1994–95 season. Since then he has also served as an assistant coach at UAB from 1996 to 2001 and the University of Cincinnati from 2001 to 2005. Kennedy's first head coaching position came during the 2005–06 season when he was named interim head coach for Cincinnati after Bob Huggins resigned. He led the Bearcats to a 21–13 record and an NIT appearance that year. He was named the NY Post Big East Coach of the Year.

Ole Miss
In his first year as head coach of Ole Miss, Kennedy led the Rebels to a 21–13 overall record and 8–8 in conference play record to become co-champions of the Southeastern Conference Western division. The Rebels made it to the semi-finals of the SEC tournament, but fell to the eventual champions, Florida. The Rebels then received an NIT berth and won the first round against Appalachian State but fell to the eventual runners-up, Clemson.

In his 12 seasons at Ole Miss, Kennedy became the program's all-time wins leader, as well as the only head coach since World War II to finish with a winning record in SEC play.

Among Kennedy's accomplishments at Ole Miss:

 Ranks 18th in SEC history with 245 wins
 One of only 23 coaches in history with 100 SEC regular season wins (only Ole Miss head coach to accomplish that feat)
 Averaged more than 21 wins per season after the program posted only 21 or more wins three times in 96 years before his arrival
 Fifth-most wins in SEC history by a coach in his 12 years in the league at one school
 One of five coaches in SEC history to post at least nine 20-win seasons in first 11 years in the league, joining Billy Donovan, Joe B. Hall, Nolan Richardson, and Tubby Smith
 Only coach in SEC history to post 11 consecutive winning seasons after taking over a program coming off four straight losing seasons
 Six consecutive seasons of .500-or-better in SEC play (2012-2017) for the first time in program history
 Nine 20-win seasons under Kennedy; Seven 20-win seasons in 96 years before his arrival
 Eight postseason berths and 11 of the program's 20 all-time postseason wins
 During his tenure, was one of just two teams in the SEC and 14 power conference programs in the nation to have 11 straight winning seasons
 One of 20 programs in the country to finish in the RPI Top 100 for 11 consecutive seasons
 Finished with a .500-or-better record against 10 SEC teams 
 Produced 12 all-league guards and 16 All-SEC selections
 2013 SEC Tournament Champions
 2 SEC West Division titles (2007, 2010)
 2 NIT Final Four appearances
 2-time SEC Coach of the Year
 Holds 33 school records (16-team, 17 individual)
 Tied the school record with 27 wins in 2013
 Reached 100 wins faster than any coach in school history
 Nationally ranked for a total of 18 weeks, rising as high as 14th
 Produced the school's all-time leading rebounder, shot blocker, and 3-point FG shooter
 Led the SEC in scoring (77.2 ppg) for the first time in school history in 2012-2013
 In 2007-2008, set school records for longest winning streak and most wins to start a season
 In 2006-2007, won the most games (21) by a first-year Rebel head coach and received SEC Coach of the Year honors

On February 12, 2018, Kennedy initially announced that he and Ole Miss had agreed to part ways following the 2017-18 season. However, Kennedy resigned effective immediately on February 18, 2018.

Broadcasting 
In 2018, Kennedy agreed to a deal with the SEC Network to become a college basketball analyst across the ESPN family of networks. During the 2018-2019 and 2019-2020 seasons, Kennedy was featured as an in-game color analyst, studio analyst, and sideline reporter covering college basketball.

UAB
After 2 years working with ESPN, on March 20, 2020, Kennedy was hired as the head coach at UAB, replacing Robert Ehsan. In his first year Kennedy led the Blazers to a 22-7 record. The 22 wins were the most by a first year head coach in the NCAA and the most wins for UAB since 2016. Under Kennedy's guide UAB finished with their highest NET ranking in program history along with the program's highest Kenpom ranking since 2011. The Blazers were led by their defense in Kennedy's first year as they finished with the most wins in Conference USA as well as the most series sweeps. They finished 5th in the country in scoring defense while also boasting the 3rd best turnover margin in the NCAA. For the first time in UAB history they had 2 members selected to the conference All-Defense team. Kennedy's first year leading his alma mater saw UAB reach its 4th highest winning percentage in program history and be one of 17 programs in America with at least 22 wins and 7 or fewer losses.

Head coaching record

References

1968 births
Living people
American expatriate basketball people in Greece
American expatriate basketball people in the Netherlands
American expatriate basketball people in Spain
American men's basketball coaches
American men's basketball players
Basketball coaches from Mississippi
Basketball players from Mississippi
Cincinnati Bearcats men's basketball coaches
College men's basketball head coaches in the United States
NC State Wolfpack men's basketball players
Ole Miss Rebels men's basketball coaches
Parade High School All-Americans (boys' basketball)
People from Louisville, Mississippi
South Alabama Jaguars men's basketball coaches
UAB Blazers men's basketball coaches
UAB Blazers men's basketball players